Daviesia obovata, commonly known as paddle-leaf daviesia, is a species of flowering plant in the family Fabaceae and is endemic to the south-west of Western Australia. It is an erect, slender shrub with scattered egg-shaped phyllodes with the narrower end towards the base, and yellow flowers with pale green markings.

Description

Taxonomy
Daviesia obovata was first described in 1853 by Nikolai Turczaninow in the Bulletin de la Société Impériale des Naturalistes de Moscou.  The specific epithet (obovata) means "inverted egg-shaped".

Distribution and habitat
Paddle-leaf daviesia grows in heath with Eucalyptus marginata and is restricted to the eastern Stirling Range and the Barren Range in the Esperance Plains biogeographic region.

Conservation status 
This daviesia is listed as "endangered" species under the Australian Government Environment Protection and Biodiversity Conservation Act 1999 and as "Threatened" by the Western Australian Government Department of Parks and Wildlife, meaning that it is in danger of extinction. A major threat to the species is dieback due to Phytophthora cinnamomi.

References

External links
Daviesia obovata Flickr image

obovata
Flora of Western Australia
Taxa named by Nikolai Turczaninow
Plants described in 1853